Second Lieutenant Edward Darby    (born 7 March 1888, date of death unknown) was a World War I flying ace credited with six aerial victories.

Military career
On 5 August 1917 Darby was serving as an Air Mechanic 1st Class in No. 5 Squadron RNAS when he and pilot Robert Jope-Slade, in a DH.4, drove down an Albatros D.III over Snellegem. Darby was subsequently awarded the Distinguished Service Medal on 14 September, and on 19 November was appointed a probationary observer officer.

On 17 April 1918 Darby was commissioned in the newly formed Royal Air Force as a second lieutenant (observer officer). He was assigned to No. 202 Squadron RAF, formerly No. 2 Squadron RNAS, also flying the DH.4. With pilot Lieutenant A. L. Godfrey, Darby gained his second aerial victory on 4 June, destroying a Pfalz D.III off Zeebrugge. His third came on 27 June, with Lieutenant Laurence Pearson, driving down another D.III over Ostend. On 16 July he and Captain A. V. Bowater accounted for another D.III, driven down south of Ostend. His fifth and sixth victories came on 16 September, again with Lt. Pearson, driving down another D.III over Lissewege, and shooting a Fokker D.VII down in flames over Dudzele.

Darby finally left the RAF, being transferred to the unemployed list on 20 February 1919.

References

1888 births
Year of death missing
Military personnel from Liverpool
Royal Naval Air Service aviators
Royal Air Force personnel of World War I
British World War I flying aces
Recipients of the Distinguished Service Medal (United Kingdom)